Grundy County is a county in the U.S. state of Illinois. According to the 2010 census, it has a population of 50,063. Its county seat is Morris.

Grundy County is part of the Chicago-Naperville-Elgin, IL-IN-WI Metropolitan Statistical Area.

In 2010, the center of population of Illinois was in Grundy County, just northeast of the village of Mazon.

Illinois's state fossil, the unique and bizarre Tully Monster, was first found in Mazon Creek. Grundy County is home to Dresden Generating Station—the first privately financed nuclear power plant built in the United States—and the Morris Operation—the only de facto high-level radioactive waste storage site in the United States.

History
Grundy County was established on February 17, 1841. It was formed out of LaSalle County and named after U.S. Attorney General Felix Grundy (1777–1840). The county was well known for its coal mines and attracted miners from Pennsylvania and other regions to work its deposits. 
The 1883 Diamond Mine Disaster occurred in Grundy County. The disaster took the lives of 69 men and boys who were trapped underground when water broke through into the mine after days of heavy rain and the pumps could not keep up with the rising water.  22 bodies were eventually recovered, the remaining 44 were left in the mine and the mine was sealed.  Today a marker stands near where it was believed the majority of victims were entombed.

Geography

Climate and weather

Major highways
 
 
 
  US 66

Adjacent counties
 Kendall (north)
 Will (east)
 Kankakee (southeast)
 Livingston (south)
 LaSalle (west)

Demographics 

As of the 2010 United States Census, there were 50,063 people, 18,546 households, and 13,431 families residing in the county. The racial makeup of the county was 93.7% white, 1.2% black or African American, 0.7% Asian, 0.2% American Indian, 2.7% from other races, and 1.5% from two or more races. Those of Hispanic or Latino origin made up 8.2% of the population. In terms of ancestry, 28.3% were German, 23.0% were Irish, 12.7% were Italian, 9.4% were Polish, 8.6% were English, 7.1% were Norwegian, and 3.0% were American.

Of the 18,546 households, 38.6% had children under the age of 18 living with them, 57.8% were married couples living together, 9.7% had a female householder with no husband present, 27.6% were non-families, and 22.5% of all households were made up of individuals. The average household size was 2.69 and the average family size was 3.16. The median age was 36.1 years.

The median income for a household in the county was $64,297 and the median income for a family was $75,000. Males had a median income of $58,491 versus $36,592 for females. The per capita income for the county was $27,895. About 5.2% of families and 6.9% of the population were below the poverty line, including 8.0% of those under age 18 and 6.5% of those age 65 or over.

Communities

City
 Morris

Villages

 Braceville
 Carbon Hill
 Channahon (part)
 Coal City (part)
 Diamond (part)
 Dwight (part)
 East Brooklyn
 Gardner
 Godley (part)
 Kinsman
 Mazon
 Minooka (mostly)
 Seneca (part)
 South Wilmington
 Verona

Former Communities
 Jugtown

Townships
Grundy County is divided into seventeen townships:

 Aux Sable
 Braceville
 Erienna
 Felix
 Garfield
 Goodfarm
 Goose Lake
 Greenfield
 Highland
 Maine
 Mazon
 Morris
 Nettle Creek
 Norman
 Saratoga
 Vienna
 Wauponsee

Unincorporated communities

 Mazonia
 Paytonville
 Nettle Creek
 Wauponsee

Politics

See also
 National Register of Historic Places listings in Grundy County, Illinois

References

External links 
 Grundy County website
 Grundy County Jobs

 
Illinois counties
1841 establishments in Illinois
Populated places established in 1841
Chicago metropolitan area